Lucknawi, Lucknavi, Lakhnavi or Lakhnawi  is a Muslim surname from Urdu, meaning someone from Lucknow in India. It may refer to the following people:
Abd al-Hayy al-Lucknawi (1848–1886), Indian Islamic scholar
Arzoo Lakhnavi (1873–1951), Urdu poet and lyricist
Behzad Lucknavi (1900–1974), Pakistani poet and lyricist
Majaz Lakhnawi (1911–1955), Indian Urdu poet and writer, uncle of Javed Akhtar
Munavvar Lakhnavi (1897–1970), Indian Urdu poet  
Safi Lakhnavi (1862–1950), Indian Urdu poet  
Sahir Lakhnavi (1931–2019), Pakistani poet and writer  
Salik Lucknawi (1913–2013), pen name of the Indian Urdu poet and journalist Shaukat Riaz Kapoor

See also 

 Lucknow (disambiguation)

Urdu-language surnames
Indian surnames
People from Lucknow
Toponymic surnames
Nisbas